The AN/ALE-47 Airborne Countermeasures Dispenser System is used to protect military aircraft from incoming radar and infrared homing missiles. It works by dispensing flares or chaff. It is used on a variety of U.S. Air Force, Navy, and Army aircraft, as well as in other militaries.

Overview
The AN/ALE-47 countermeasure dispenser system was developed by Tracor, now part of BAE Systems, as an improved version of the older ALE-40 system, with more autonomy and software.  The AN/ALE-47 countermeasure dispenser system is also manufactured by Symetrics Industries, out of Melbourne, Florida. The AN/ALE-47 system can be integrated on a wide range of aircraft, including helicopters, cargo aircraft and fighters. It reached initial operational capability (IOC) in the U.S. Navy in 1998. It has been integrated on 38 different types of aircraft, including the F-16, F/A-18, C-17, CH-47 and UH-60. As of 2008, over 3000 sets have been delivered and the system is used by 30 different nations.

Function
The ALE-47 is integrated with the aircraft's radar warning receivers, missile warning receivers and other electronic warfare sensors. When the aircraft's sensors detect a threat, the countermeasure dispenser system automatically launches radiofrequency and infrared countermeasures at the optimum time to defeat incoming missiles. The ALE is compatible with a wide variety of countermeasures such as different types of flares and chaff. It is also designed to work with advanced future countermeasures.

Components
The ALE-47 consists of a cockpit control unit, sequencer units, countermeasure dispensers and an optional programmer. The cockpit control unit provides an interface with the pilot. A programmer can be added to add extra features, such as advanced threat evaluation. It can also be used to fully integrate the system with an aircraft's glass cockpit eliminating the need for the cockpit control unit. The sequencer units control the dispensers, and are automatically capable of detecting misfires and correcting them. The sequencers are built into the dispenser units on the rotary-wing version. Each dispenser can hold five different types of countermeasures for a total of 30. The whole system can accommodate up to 32 dispensers on fixed-wing aircraft and 16 on rotary-wing aircraft.

See also
Flare (countermeasure)
Chaff (countermeasure)
Electronic warfare
Infrared countermeasures
AN/ALQ-144

References

External links 
 Symetrics Industries ALE-47 product page
 Symetrics Industries ALE-47 product brochure
 BAE Systems ALE-47 product page

Electronic warfare equipment
Military electronics of the United States
Raytheon Company products
Equipment of the United States Air Force
Electronic countermeasures
Military equipment introduced in the 1990s